Helicon Ape is a piece of software by Helicon Tech designed to introduce Apache functionality on IIS web servers. Helicon Ape was created as an ASP.NET module for IIS 7 (and higher), implementing functionality of more than 35 Apache modules, that allow using Apache configurations (leaving syntax intact) on IIS and extending standard IIS capabilities.

Aside from the introduction of Apache modules, Helicon Ape possesses proprietary modules for server-side debugging and profiling (mod_developer), SEO optimization (mod_linkfreeze), and hotlinking protection (mod_hotlink).

Helicon Ape has a GUI interface that allows easy configuration (directives auto-completion and spell-check features supported) and browsing, and includes a regular expressions tester and a password generation utility.

Modules
Here's the list of modules currently supported in Helicon Ape:

 mod_asis - sends files that contain their own HTTP headers
 mod_auth_basic - enables HTTP Basic Authentication functionality
 mod_auth_digest - enables MD5 Digest Authentication functionality
 mod_authn_anon - configures anonymous users access to authenticated areas
 mod_authn_dbd - provides authentication based on user look-up in SQL database
 mod_authn_default - rejects whatever credentials if no authentication is set
 mod_authn_file - provides authentication based on user look-up in plain text password file
 mod_authz_default - rejects any authorization request if no authentication is configured
 mod_authz_groupfile - allows or denies access to particular areas of the site depending on user group membership
 mod_authz_host - allows access control to particular parts of web server based on hostname, IP address or other characteristics of the client request
 mod_authz_user - allows or denies access to portions of the web site for authenticated users
 mod_cache - allows caching local or proxied content
 mod_core - provides the use of Helicon Ape core features
 mod_dbd - allows managing of SQL database connections
 mod_deflate - enables server output compression
 mod_developer - brings extensive requests debugging functionality
 mod_disk_cache - allows the use of disk-based storage engine for mod_cache
 mod_env - grants control over the environment provided to CGI scripts and SSI pages
 mod_evasive - protects your site(s) from HTTP DoS/DDoS attacks and brute force attacks
 mod_expires - sets Expires HTTP header and max-age directive of Cache-Control HTTP header in server responses in relation to either the time the source file was last modified, or to the time of the client access
 mod_filter - allows the use of context-sensitive content filters
 mod_gzip - offers HTTP responses compression
 mod_headers - modifies HTTP request and response headers
 mod_hotlink - protects the content from hotlinking
 mod_linkfreeze - changes links on pages to SEO-friendly format
 mod_log_config - enables custom logging
 mod_logio - logs input and output number of bytes received/sent per request
 mod_mem_cache - allows the use memory-based storage engine for mod_cache
 mod_mime - associates requested filename's extensions with the file's behavior (handlers and filters) and content (mime-type, language, character set and encoding)
 mod_proxy - grants forward and reverse proxy functionality
 mod_replace - allows editing of HTML body, HTTP request and response headers
 mod_rewrite - rewrites requested URLs on the fly based on regular-expressions-based rules and various conditions
 mod_setenvif - sets environment variables depending on whether different parts of the request match specified regular expressions
 mod_so - emulates loading modules functions
 mod_speling - corrects misspelled URLs by performing case-insensitive checks and allowing one misspelling
 mod_usertrack - tracks and logs user activity on the site using cookies

Compatibility
Helicon Ape was designed specifically to benefit from all advantages of IIS 7 architecture, so 100% operability is ensured only on IIS 7 and higher (Windows Vista, Windows Server 2008, Windows 7, and Windows Server 2008 R2). On IIS6 (Windows Server 2003), Helicon Ape offers slightly limited functionality (see compatibility chart).

License
There are three license types available for Helicon Ape:
 Free - for up to 3 sites; costs nothing
 Per-site - for one extra site; costs $25
 Server - for unlimited number of sites; costs $95; includes 45-day Trial period.

See also
 Apache HTTP Server
 Comparison of web server software
 Helicon Tech
 Internet Information Services
 URL redirection

References

External links
 Helicon Ape official page
 Helicon Tech official blog

Web server software